Lee Si-yeon (born Lee Dae-hak on July 24, 1980) is a South Korean actress and model. In 1999, Lee participated in the Anti-Miss Korea competition. In November 2007, Lee underwent sex reassignment surgery and changed her name to Si-yeon. Lee is the niece of Seo Jae-hyuk, a singer-songwriter and guitarist, member of Boohwal.

Life 
Lee debuted as a male model under her birth name Dae-hak, becoming known for her feminine appearance and wearing women's clothing on the catwalk, but ultimately wished to pursue a career as an actor. She appeared in the films My Boss, My Hero (2001) and Sex Is Zero (2002), providing comic relief in effeminate male roles, but felt pressured into cutting her hair and building up muscle. Lee recalled that, "once I entered showbiz, I was forced to live a life I didn't like", and growing increasingly unhappy, made several attempts at suicide before deciding to transition.

Adopting the given name Si-yeon, Lee underwent sex reassignment surgery in 2007, and admitted to having doubts over her sexuality since being in secondary school. She returned to acting later that year in the sequel Sex Is Zero 2, with her character from the original film now also a transsexual. Lee publicly announced her sex reassignment prior to the release of the film, but was apprehensive about the reaction from audiences. Co-star Shin Yi observed that surgery had not changed her image much, and stated that she had always regarded Lee as a "kid sister".

Filmography

Film

Studio albums 
 I Became a Woman (2010)

See also 
 Harisu
 Hong Seok-cheon
 Jin Xing

References

External links 
 Lee Si-yeon at Buto ken Uki
 
 
 이시연 "남자로 산 27년, 행동과 표정 모두 거짓"(인터뷰) 
 트랜스젠더 가수 이시연, 부활 서재혁과 5촌 당숙지간  스포츠투데이 2011.04.21 
 큰 용기 이시연, ‘누가 그녀에게 돌을 던지랴’ 데일리안 2007.11.09 
 트렌스젠더 배우 이시연 가수 변신···“난 여자가 됐어” 강원일보 2010.04.13 
 [거꾸로 사는 사람들] '트랜스젠더' 하리수와 이시연 스포츠조선 2009.07.06 
  트랜스젠더 이시연 가수 데뷔 '여자가 됐어 뉴시스 2010.05.06 

1980 births
Living people
People from Daejeon
South Korean female models
South Korean film actresses
South Korean television actresses
South Korean women pop singers
Transgender actresses
Transgender female models
Transgender singers
South Korean transgender people
South Korean LGBT actors
South Korean LGBT singers
21st-century South Korean actresses
21st-century South Korean women singers